Kaustinen is a municipality of Finland. It is part of the Central Ostrobothnia region.

Neighbouring municipalities are Halsua, Kokkola, Kronoby and Veteli. The municipality is unilingually Finnish.

It is the home of the Kaustinen Folk Music Festival, held every July. The "house band" is JPP. The comic strip bird Woodstock, named for the rock music festival in Woodstock, New York, is called Kaustinen in Finnish with obvious reference to this folk music festival.

Europe's largest lithium reserve is located in Kaustinen area

Transport
Kaustinen is served by OnniBus.com route Helsinki—Jyväskylä—Kokkola.

Famous people from Kaustinen
 Kreeta Haapasalo (1813–1893), Kantele player and songwriter
 Konsta Jylhä (1910–1984), folk music composer, fiddler and master pelimanni
 Pehr Henrik Nordgren (1944–2008), classical composer

References

External links

Municipality of Kaustinen – Official website

 
Populated places established in 1866
1866 establishments in the Russian Empire